Moral Landscape may refer to:

 In the Science of morality, the peaks and troughs of various ethical systems in maximizing the flourishing of conscious creatures
 The Moral Landscape (book), a non-fiction written by Sam Harris arguing that science can determine human values